Norwegian Ninja is a 2010 Norwegian action comedy film, directed by Thomas Cappelen Malling. The film, based on a 2006 book, presents real-life espionage-convicted Arne Treholt as the leader of a ninja group saving Norway during the Cold War and stars Mads Ousdal as Treholt.

The film is loosely based on the story of Norwegian politician and diplomat Arne Treholt, who in 1985 was convicted of high treason and espionage on behalf of the Soviet Union and Iraq. In 2006, Thomas Cappelen Malling wrote the book Ninjateknikk II. Usynlighet i strid 1978 ("Ninja Technique II: Invisibility in combat 1978"). The book was presented as a military manual written by Treholt in 1978. It achieved a certain cult status, and was considered a success at 5,000 units sold.

Plot
The story, set during the Cold War, involves the conflict between the Norwegian ninjas, King Olav V's secret army tasked to maintain Norway's independence, and a clandestine stay-behind group who carry out false flag operations that get blamed on Communists.

Cast
Mads Ousdal as Arne Treholt
Jon Øigarden as Otto Meyer
Trond-Viggo Torgersen as King Olav V
Linn Stokke as Ragnhild Umbraco
Amund Maarud as Bumblebee
Martinus Grimstad Olsen as Black Peter
Øyvind Venstad Kjeksrud as Øystein Fjellberg
Henrik Horge as Kusken

Production
In December 2008 the Norwegian Film Institute gave a support to film project made by Cappelen Malling with NOK 10.5 million, in spite of the fact that the author had no previous experience from the movie industry. The book forms the basis for the film, where an alternative universe-Treholt leads a group of ninjas set up by then-King Olav V to combat the Soviets. The original working title was Nytt norsk håp ("New Norwegian Hope"), and the total budget was NOK 19 million. The producers describe the story as taking place directly before Treholt's arrest in 1984, presenting "the true story of how Commander Arne Treholt and his Ninja Force saved Norway during the Cold War". Cappelen Malling himself describes the film as "alternative history", but only in the sense that all history is alternative. Treholt himself has allegedly given his consent to both the book and the movie.

The absurd premise of the film secured a great deal of media attention for it ahead of its release. Aftenposten, in January 2010, predicted it would be one of the most absurd works of Norwegian cinema. Verdens Gang quoted producer Eric Vogel, saying that "something like this has never been made in Norway before. Or in the world, as far as I know!" They also interviewed Mads Ousdal, who portrayed Treholt in the film, describing the role as very different from anything he had done previously. Comedian Trond Viggo Torgersen played the part of King Olav V.

Reception
Although the movie was not a big box-office success, it did receive some very good reviews. J.S. Marcus of The Wall Street Journal: "Hilarious and menacing, absurd and insightful, and an accomplished work of genre film making that authoritatively upends the cold-war spy thriller".

See also
Operation Gladio, an anti-communist stay-behind operation that ran in a number of NATO countries as well as neutral states after WWII

References

External links
 
 
 Norwegian Ninja at Nordic Fantasy

2010 films
2010 action comedy films
Norwegian alternate history films
Films based on Norwegian novels
Ninja films
2010s Norwegian-language films
English-language Norwegian films
Cold War spy films
2010s spy comedy films
Norwegian action comedy films
2010 comedy films
2010s English-language films